Glest is a free and open-source  real-time strategy computer game from 2004. Glest is set in a medieval fantasy world with two factions, and was compared with Warcraft III and the Empire Earth series. The game received positive to mixed reviews from the press, has been downloaded over two million times, and spawned several derivative continuation projects which are under active development.

Development
The game was started by a team based in Spain around 2004.
Release of version 3.0 added online multiplayer LAN/Internet support. Glest is designed to be moddable, with game elements defined by editable XML files, and includes a map editor.

Since April 2009, development on the original game has ceased. However, two forks, MegaGlest and the Glest Advanced Engine (GAE) have continued developing the game and its engine further. While MegaGlest is focused on stable releases which provide reliable cross platform multi-player games and deliver new game content out of the box, GAE is primarily oriented towards improving the game engine and providing more options for full conversions, and is more experimental in nature.

In 2011 it was suggested that the two forks should merge but due to different philosophies and goals amongst the developers of both forks this effort was called off during the planning stage.

Gameplay
Glest is set in a medieval fantasy world with two factions, named Magic and Tech, each with their own set of units, buildings and upgrades. The Tech faction uses traditional human warriors and has medieval mechanical devices in its arsenal, and are strong in melee combat. The Magic faction is designed for advanced players with most of their units morphed from or summoned by others. It lacks the hand-to-hand combat strength of the Tech faction but features more versatile units. Tilesets and maps are selected at the new game setup menu and determine the graphical nature of the Glest game world.

Because of the moddability of the engine, Glest can play games from a variety of player-created mods. These range from futuristic science fiction themes to dark, high fantasy settings.

Reception
Acid Play: Rating: 9.2 "A totally awesome 3D strategy game based in the magic forests during medieval times."
CNET Download.com gave Glest v3.1 5 Stars (User Rating 4 out of 5 stars) and compared it to Warcraft III and the Empire Earth series in 2009:

happypenguin.org: Rating: 4.48 out of 5 stars
Casualty gamer: In October 2008 reviewed version 3.1.2.
About.com: Reviewed the game and highlighted the detailed 3D graphics in Glest, but criticized the underdeveloped gameplay and small number of maps in that version.

By July 2016 Glest had been downloaded on SourceForge alone over 2,300,000 times.

See also

 List of open-source games

References

External links 

Official MegaGlest site

Free software programmed in C++
Strategy video games
Windows games
Linux games
Open-source video games
MegaGlest
Real-time strategy video games
Lua (programming language)-scriptable game engines
Free game engines
Creative Commons-licensed video games
Multiplayer and single-player video games